George Manook; (Gevork Manuch Merchell/Manukian Manuchariants), an Armenian merchant of Java, was among the richest figures in the Dutch East Indies, and on several occasions lent large sums of money to the Dutch government. He left behind a fortune of five million guilders when he died.

Biography 
He was born in New Julfa, in Persia, in 1763 or 1767 and died on 24 October 1827 in Batavia. He died a bachelor.

After significant bequests to the Armenian College (Kolkata), the Armenian School of Madras (Chennai), and ecclesiastical establishments in Armenia, Jerusalem and New Julfa, he left the balance of his estate to his two sisters and his late brother's son.

References
Jacob Seth Mesrovb, History of the Armenians in India from the Earliest Times to the Present Day (published by the author, Calcutta 1937) 190 pp at page 132.

Businesspeople from Isfahan
Persian Armenians
People of the Dutch East Indies
1827 deaths
1760s births
Armenian businesspeople
Indonesian businesspeople